Cifte hammam is a hammam in the Old Bazaar of Skopje, North Macedonia. It was built in the mid-15th century by Bosnian general Isa-Beg Ishaković in order to provide a regular source of income for his endowment.

Etymology 

Name of the hammam is derived from the Turkish word "çift" meaning "two" or "couple" as the building consists of two main parts. Since 2001 the object is used for exhibitions as a part of the National institution “National gallery of Macedonia”.

Characteristics 

Male and female dressing rooms are apart with a joint bath area. There were three separate rooms with high temperature, of which one was constructed with a pool for ritual bath of the Jews in Skopje. Today it is not operational and houses part of the exhibition of the National Gallery of Macedonia whose head office is in Multimedia center "Mala stanica". Daut Paşa Hammam is also part of the National Gallery of Macedonia.

See also
Hammam
Old Bazaar, Skopje
Ottoman Vardar Macedonia

External links 
 Text about Cifte hammam on web site about Old Skopje
 National Gallery of Macedonia - official web page

Ottoman architecture in North Macedonia
Buildings and structures in Skopje

Ottoman baths